Grainville School is an 11–16 inclusive secondary school in Jersey. The school has approximately 750 students and 70 members of staff.

History
Grainville School is an 11–16 state non-fee paying secondary school in Jersey, Channel Islands. It was established in 1980.

Headteachers
 Susan Morris: 2015 - 2016, 2018 - current
 John McGuinness BA(Hons) NPQH: 2009 - 2015, 2016 - 2017 (seconded Academy 360)
 David Cahill: 2006–2009 
 Keith Shannon: 2004–2006
 Mario Lundy: 1997–2004

See also
List of schools in Jersey

References

External links
 

Schools in Jersey
Secondary schools in the Channel Islands
Saint Saviour, Jersey